XTNCT is a DJ based in Philadelphia, also known as Zach Brill.

Synopsis
In the far future, the remnants of the human race use genetically engineered animals to fight for them. The character of Father uses special dinosaur commandos to fight on his behalf. A raptor from one such group of commandos accidentally kills a human and Father orders the death of the entire group. They escape and decide to hunt down and kill all the remaining humans on the Earth.

Bibliography
 XTNCT (with Paul Cornell and D'Israeli, in Judge Dredd Megazine #209-214, 2003–2004, collected in trade paperback, XTNCT: CM ND HV G F Y THNK YR HRD NGH!, 48 pages, hardcover, December 2006)

Characters
 Father 
 Rex Leader of the group of commandos, genetically based on a Tyrannosaurus.
 Forest Plant life form.
 Aviatrix Flying member of the group, with physiology based on a Pterosaur.
 Trike Large and heavily armed commando, based on a Triceratops.
 Raptor Very aggressive member of the group, capable of travelling at extremely high speeds, based on a Deinonychus, a relative of the Velociraptor''.

External links
2000 AD profile
Review of the trade

Notes

Dinosaurs in comic strips
2000 AD comic strips
Works by Paul Cornell